Auto Train is an  scheduled daily train service for passengers and their automobiles operated by Amtrak between Lorton, Virginia (near Washington, D.C.), and Sanford, Florida (near Orlando).  Auto Train is the only motorail service in the United States.

Passengers ride in coach seats or private sleeping car rooms while their vehicles are carried in enclosed automobile-carrying freight cars called autoracks. The train can carry up to 320 vehicles. The train also includes lounge cars and dining cars. Auto Train allows its passengers to avoid driving Interstate 95 in Virginia, North Carolina, South Carolina, Georgia, and Florida while bringing their own vehicles with them. It has the highest revenue of any Amtrak long-distance train.

The service operates as train number 52 northbound and number 53 southbound. The train operates non-stop between its Virginia and Florida terminals, except for a brief stop in Florence, South Carolina, for servicing and a crew change of the engineer and conductors.

Amtrak's Auto Train is the successor to an earlier, similarly named service operated by the privately-owned Auto-Train Corporation in the 1970s.

History

Auto-Train Corporation 

The original Auto-Train operated on Seaboard Coast Line Railroad and Richmond, Fredericksburg & Potomac tracks. It was operated by Auto-Train Corporation, a privately owned railroad carrier founded by Eugene K. Garfield. Garfield had worked at the U.S. Department of Transportation, which had funded a study of the practicality of an automobile-train service. Garfield resigned and used the study as the blueprint for his enterprise. The company provided a service unique in the country: scheduled rail transportation for passengers and their automobiles between Lorton, Virginia, near Washington, D.C., and Sanford, Florida, near Orlando, Florida.

The Auto-Train Corporation used its own rolling stock, painted in red, white, and purple. The typical train was equipped with two or three General Electric U36B diesel-electric locomotives;  double-deck auto carriers; streamlined passenger cars, including coaches, dining cars, and sleeping cars; and  full-dome cars; and a caboose, then an unusual sight on most passenger trains. The engines were freight types, purchased at much lower cost than passenger types. But they lacked steam generators, so heat to the passenger cars was supplied by steam-generator cars. Passengers rode in wide coach seats or private first-class sleeping compartments, and meals were served in dining cars. Their vehicles were carried in enclosed autoracks. The company's first autoracks were acquired used, and started life in the 1950s as an innovation of the Canadian National (CN) Railroad. The CN cars were huge by the standards of the time: each 75-footer (23.86 m) could carry eight vehicles, which were loaded through end-doors.

The Auto-Train began running on December 6, 1971. It was immediately popular with the traveling public and at first enjoyed financial success as well. In FY1974 the company turned a profit of $1.6 million on revenues of $20 million. In May 1974, service began over a second route between Florida and Louisville, Kentucky, and the company was mulling additional service between Chicago and Denver. The Louisville extension proved to be the company's undoing. The decaying Louisville and Nashville Railroad track between Louisville and Florida (which also hampered Amtrak's Floridian) hindered operations, and a pair of derailments stretched the company's finances to the breaking point. Service ceased in April 1981.

Amtrak 

After 22 months, the service was revived by Amtrak, which operates most intercity passenger trains in the United States. Amtrak acquired the terminals in Lorton and Sanford and some of the Auto-Train equipment. On October 30, 1983, it introduced a triweekly version of the service under the restyled name "Auto Train". Daily service was introduced a year later.

Amtrak used Auto-Train's bi-level and tri-level autoracks. For passenger equipment, it initially used a mixture of former Auto-Train railcars and mid-century long-distance railcars from Amtrak's general fleet, all rebuilt to Amtrak's "Heritage Fleet" standards. In the mid-1990s, Amtrak replaced all these passenger railcars, which were of the conventional single-level type, with its newer, bi-level Superliner I and II equipment. In 2006, the aging bi-level, tri-level, and "van" autoracks were phased out and replaced with 80 new autoracks. Unlike the old racks, the new racks have uniform heights and are most similar to the "vans" of the previous fleet. 

Amtrak operates two Auto Trains simultaneously each day, Train No. 53 from Lorton and Train No. 52 from Sanford, departing at 5 p.m. for a scheduled arrival the following day at 10 a.m. In practice, however, the trains usually run late. In May 2021, for example, only 31 percent of Auto Trains arrived on time, mostly because of interference by freight trains that have preference over much of the route.

The Auto Train was the last Amtrak service to permit smoking on board. Amtrak discontinued the practice on June 1, 2013.

Auto Train operates on the same route it and its predecessor have always used; most of the route is owned by CSX Transportation while 16 miles are owned by SunRail. 

The trains are known by their route numbers internally by Amtrak. When communicating on the CSX road channels, they are known by their CSX designations: P053xx and P052xx, where xx is the 2-digit date on which the train departed its origin station. For example, a southbound train that departed on the 23rd of the month would be known as CSX P05323 on the road channels. This allows for unique identification when two trains on the same route are operating simultaneously.

Ridership 
Ridership hit a peak of 274,445 in Amtrak's fiscal year 2014. Ridership declined through 2019, then dropped some 30% to 163,556 in 2020, the first year of the COVID-19 pandemic. It recovered somewhat in 2021 to 199,414 and then set a new ridership record in 2022 with 279,019 passengers.

The Auto Train has the highest revenue of any Amtrak long-distance train. The train had total revenue of US$75,169,554 in FY2016, down 7.9% from FY2015.

Operations 

The train operates every day. At 12:30 pm, the station gates are opened to allow the vehicles into the vehicle staging area. Here, each vehicle is assigned a unique number, which is affixed to the driver's door magnetically. The vehicle is typically videoed to document existing dents and other damage, in case a damage claim is later filed. The passengers leave their vehicles here and take their carry-on bags with them into the station to await boarding. The vehicles are then staged near the autorack ramps by size and length for optimal loading order and are then loaded onto the autoracks. Motorcycle owners help tie their bikes down to a motorcycle carrier that is then loaded into the autorack. Passengers cannot access their vehicles during the trip.

The last vehicles and passengers are accepted up until 3 p.m., after which the autoracks are closed and coupled together, the passenger cars are coupled together in the case of Sanford departures, and the autoracks are coupled to the rear of the consist. At 5 p.m., the train departs the station. 

About 1 a.m., the train makes its sole scheduled stop, at the Florence, South Carolina, station, where a new engineer and conductors take over and the train takes on fuel and water. No passengers embark or disembark here.

The schedule calls for the trains to arrive in Lorton and Sanford about 10 a.m. the next day. When the trains arrive on time, they have covered the 855-mile (1,376 km) journey in about 17 hours, at an average speed of about 50 miles per hour (80 km/h). 

Passengers cannot immediately leave the train, as the autoracks are first decoupled from the consist, and in the case of the Sanford station, the passenger cars are split into two sections to fit on Sanford's shorter platforms. At this point, the passengers are then allowed to disembark and move to the auto claim area. Cleaning crews move into the train after passengers leave, and the train is re-supplied with food and water. The passenger cars' seat backs are flipped to allow everyone in coach to ride facing forward.

The autoracks are further split into three to six sections and each section is aligned with a loading ramp (see picture). The doors between each are opened, and connecting ramps are lowered to allow vehicles to move between cars. At this point vehicles begin to roll off the autoracks and to the claim area, where they are identified and announced by the vehicle number that was attached to the vehicle at the origin station. Vehicles are not unloaded in the same order they were loaded. It normally takes one hour to unload all vehicles from a full train. The first 30 vehicles off belong to passengers who have paid $60 or $65, depending on peak or off-peak travel times, a service Amtrak has offered by the name Priority Vehicle Offloading since April 2013.

Lorton Terminal 

Lorton, Virginia, is about a half-hour drive south of Washington, D.C., near Interstate 95 in Northern Virginia. Amtrak's new Lorton terminal opened in early 2000 as a replacement for the original station built during the 1970s, and features a large, modern waiting area with high glass walls. The station was designed by architect Hanny Hassan. The suspended sculpture in the lobby was designed by Patrick Sheridan.

Lorton was selected as site of the northern terminal because the  height autoracks were too tall to pass through the First Street Tunnel into Washington, D.C.

Sanford Terminal 

Sanford, Florida, is the southern terminus and is about a half-hour drive north of Orlando. The original facility was older and smaller than the terminal at Lorton. At Sanford, the Auto Train loads passengers on two tracks, as no one track is long enough to accommodate all the passenger railcars. Sanford's operation is unique in that a railroad crossing runs through the middle of the rail yard. This complicates some switching procedures and also requires a three-man yard conductor crew – conductor, assistant conductor, and a utility conductor – while operations at Lorton requires only a conductor and assistant conductor. Both yards operate with one engineer. Sanford serves as the main mechanical and maintenance location for Auto Train, with diesel and car shops to service the fleet. The city of Sanford provides a shuttle bus to the historic district departing every 20 minutes between noon and 2:00 pm free of charge on all days except Sundays and certain major holidays.

Consist 
The Auto Train uses Amtrak’s bi-level Superliner equipment, which is used for trains in the western United States and cannot pass through Baltimore Penn Station or the North River Tunnels for access to New York Penn Station. A typical consist includes two GE Genesis locomotives in the front, a transition sleeper car, three sleeping cars, a sightseer lounge car, a full-service dining car, five sleepers, a cafe dining car, four coaches, and up to 33 autoracks. 

Superliner sleeping cars have deluxe bedrooms on the upper level, roomettes on the upper and lower levels, one "family bedroom", and one "accessible bedroom". Coach cars have reclining seats on both levels. The Sightseer Lounge car has wrap-around windows on the upper level and an informal café on the lower. One dining and lounge car is reserved for sleeping car customers, while another also serves coach passengers.

See also 
 AutoTrak, a cancelled service Amtrak had planned as an answer to the Auto Train in the 1970s
 Car shuttle train
 Motorail
 Eurotunnel Shuttle (for cars and trucks)
 Rail terminology

References

Notes

Bibliography

External links 

 
Amtrak routes
Railway services introduced in 1983
Passenger rail transportation in Virginia
Passenger rail transportation in Florida
Passenger rail transportation in Georgia (U.S. state)
Passenger rail transportation in South Carolina
Passenger rail transportation in North Carolina
Night trains of the United States
1983 establishments in the United States
Long distance Amtrak routes